Predrag Azdejković (born 15 July 1978) is Serbian LGBT human rights activist, journalist, writer, film and theater producer. Azdejković is director of Gay Lesbian Info Center, director of Merlinka festival, editor in chief of Serbian only gay magazine Optimist, producer of several short films and documentaries and several award-winning theater plays that all are dedicated to LGBT population. He is a member of Journalists' Association of Serbia.

Biography 
Predrag Azdejković was born on 15 July 1978 in Leonberg, West Germany.

Until his sixth year, he lived in Germany and in 1984 he moved to Serbia, which was then part of Yugoslavia. He is a founder of GayEcho web portal, editor of Rainbow column in Yellow Cab monthly guide, founder and editor in chief of the only Serbian gay magazine Optimist, director and selector of International queer film festival Merlinka. He wrote for several Serbian media such as daily Sutra, Borba, web portal E-novine, weekly Vreme, monthly Status, Beton. In 2006 he became VIP blogger at B92 blog. In 2006 he co-authored the book Others - From patriarchal construction to alternative politics. He published satirical book Time of hemorrhoids in 2011. In 2017 he co-authored the book I have something to say to you - Return from Brisbane and other stories

Film

Theater

References

External links
 Predrag Azdejković Personal website
 B92 VIP blog
 GayEcho web portal
 International queer film festival Merlinka
 Optimist magazine
 

1978 births
Serbian human rights activists
Serbian LGBT rights activists
Gay journalists
Serbian journalists
LGBT film producers
Serbian LGBT journalists
Serbian activists
Serbian writers
Living people